Vladimir Peshekhonov (Пешехонов, Владимир Игоревич ; born December 3, 1993) is a Russian professional ice hockey player. He is currently playing within the Torpedo Ust-Kamenogorsk organization of the Supreme Hockey League (VHL).

Peshekhonov made his Kontinental Hockey League (KHL) debut playing with HC Spartak Moscow during the 2013–14 KHL season.

References

External links

1993 births
Living people
Atlant Moscow Oblast players
HC CSKA Moscow players
Russian ice hockey forwards
HC Sibir Novosibirsk players
HC Spartak Moscow players
Ice hockey people from Moscow